The 2020 CMT Music Awards were held in Nashville, Tennessee on October 21, 2020. Kane Brown, Sarah Hyland and Ashley McBryde were the hosts for the show. The CMT Music Awards are a fan-voted awards show for country music videos and television performances; Voting takes place on CMT's website.

Winners and nominees 
Winners are shown in bold.

References 

CMT Music Awards
CMT Music Awards
CMT Music Awards
CMT Music Awards
CMT Music Awards
CMT Music Awards